Felicity A. Nussbaum (born 1944) is  Distinguished Research Professor of English at the University of California, Los Angeles. Her research interests include 18th-century literature and culture, critical theory, gender studies and  postcolonial and Anglophone studies. In the past she taught at Syracuse University and Indiana University South Bend.

She earned B.A., magna cum laude from the Austin College and M.A. and Ph.D. from the Indiana University.

Books
2010: Rival Queens: Actresses, Performance, and the Eighteenth-Century British Theater 
2008: (co-ed. with Saree Makdisi) The Arabian Nights in Historical Context: Between East and West
2003: The Limits of the Human: Fictions of Anomaly, Race and Gender in the Long Eighteenth Century
2003: (ed.) The Global Eighteenth Century
The 21 essays of the book are "contributions to the new field of 'critical global studies' of the long eighteenth century".
2000: “Defects”: Engendering the Modern Body
1995: Torrid Zones: Maternity, Sexuality and Empire in Eighteenth-Century English Narratives 
1989: The Autobiographical Subject: Gender and Ideology in Eighteenth-Century England
1987: (co-ed. with Laura Brown) The New Eighteenth Century: Theory/Politics/English Literature
1984: “The Brink of All We Hate”: English Satires on Women, 1660–1750
1976: (ed.) Three Seventeenth-Century Satires

Honors
Her academic honors include:
1991: Fellow of the John Simon Guggenheim Memorial Foundation
1989: Co-recipient of the Gottschalk Prize for the best book in its field for 1989 
Andrew Mellon Fellowship at the Huntington Library
NEH Fellowship

References

External links
"Interview with Professor Felicity Nussbaum" by Michael Nicholson, Mellon Postdoctoral Fellow in the Humanities at the University of Toronto's Jackman Humanities Institute, October 31, 2016,

1944 births
Living people
University of California, Los Angeles faculty
Syracuse University faculty
Indiana University faculty
Indiana University alumni
Austin College alumni
American academics of English literature
Gender studies academics
American literary critics
Women literary critics
American women critics